WEC 23: Hot August Fights was a mixed martial arts event held on August 17, 2006. WEC 23's main event was a championship fight for the WEC Light Heavyweight Title between champion Lodune Sincaid and challenger Doug Marshall.

Results

See also
 World Extreme Cagefighting
 List of World Extreme Cagefighting champions
 List of WEC events
 2006 in WEC

References

External links
Official WEC website

World Extreme Cagefighting events
2006 in mixed martial arts
Mixed martial arts in California
Sports in Lemoore, California
2006 in sports in California